Christopher Fischer (born January 24, 1988) is a German professional ice hockey defenceman. He is currently playing for the Schwenninger Wild Wings in the Deutsche Eishockey Liga (DEL).

Playing career
After four seasons with EHC Wolfsburg, Fischer returned his original youth team Adler Mannheim on April 12, 2013.

After three additional seasons with Adler Mannheim, Fischer left as a free agent for a second time in signing a three-year contract with his third DEL outfit, the Iserlohn Roosters, on April 4, 2016.

Fischer remained with the Rooster until the conclusion of his contract following the 2018–19 season, leaving to sign a two-year contract with the Schwenninger Wild Wings on March 19, 2019.

References

External links 

1988 births
Living people
Adler Mannheim players
German ice hockey defencemen
Iserlohn Roosters players
Schwenninger Wild Wings players
Grizzlys Wolfsburg players
Sportspeople from Heidelberg